Walter Bathe (1 December 1892 – 21 September 1959) was a German breaststroke swimmer. He won gold medals in the 200 m and 400 m breaststroke at the 1912 Summer Olympics, setting Olympic records that lasted until 1924. In 1970 he was inducted to the International Swimming Hall of Fame.

Bathe took swimming aged 8 to improve poor health and at 19 won two Olympic medals. He continued swimming until about 1930, winning 6 national breaststroke championships, 5 Crownprince Trophies, and 3 River Oder swims (7.5 km). In 1910 he set two world records in the 100 m breaststroke, at 1:18.4 and 1:17.5.

See also
 List of members of the International Swimming Hall of Fame

References

1892 births
1959 deaths
People from Złotoryja County
Sportspeople from Lower Silesian Voivodeship
People from the Province of Silesia
German male swimmers
German male breaststroke swimmers
Olympic swimmers of Germany
Swimmers at the 1912 Summer Olympics
Olympic gold medalists for Germany
Medalists at the 1912 Summer Olympics
Olympic gold medalists in swimming